Jean Stansfield Memorial Park (also known as Vicarage Park) is an urban children's park in the English market town of Poulton-le-Fylde. It is located on Station Road, at its junction with Vicarage Road, one of the main roads leading to and from the town centre.

The park is named for Jean Stansfield, who died on 27 September 1923, aged ten. She was the only child of Mr and Mrs S. F. Stansfield. Three years later, after the couple purchased a parcel of glebe land from St Chad's Church, the park was completed and was dedicated to their daughter. The park was dedicated on 17 June 1926.

The park had a public bowling green, the town's first, added to it in June 1938. The park also now includes a skate park.

References

External links 

 Jean Stansfield (Vicarage) Park - Wyre Borough Council
Buildings and structures in Poulton-le-Fylde
Urban public parks
Parks in England
Memorial parks